Rock Pidjot (born November 8, 1907 in Mont-Dore, France - November 23, 1990) was a New Caledonian politician.  He served in the National Assembly of France from 1964 until 1986; in that time he sat as a member of five parties, ending with the French Socialist Party.  His nephew was Charles Pidjot, who also became a politician in New Caledonia.

1907 births
1990 deaths
New Caledonia politicians
Socialist Party (France) politicians
Kanak people